"Love Don't Live Here" is a song written and recorded by British pop duo Bananarama. It was released on 12 April 2010 as the second and final single from their tenth studio album Viva.

Song information
"Love Don't Live Here" was released on 11 April 2010 as digital download single and 12 April 2010 on vinyl and CD format. It was written by Bananarama members Sara Dallin and Keren Woodward with producer Ian Masterson. The b-side for the CD single is a new version of their 1995 song "Every Shade of Blue", while the b-side tracks for the vinyl editions are remixed versions of "The Runner" and a new song "Here Comes The Rain".

Music video
A music video for "Love Don't Live Here" was shot in London in January 2010. The video features heavily computerized effects and also scenes similar to the artwork on the sleeve of the CD single. The video was directed by photographer Tim Walker.

Formats
Love Don't Live Here was released in several formats including digital.

7 inch vinyl
"Love Don't Live Here" (Radio Mix) (S. Dallin/K. Woodward/I. Masterson)
"Here Comes The Rain" (S. Dallin/K. Woodward/I. Masterson)
12 inch vinyl
"Love Don't Live Here" (Ian Masterson's Extended Mix) (S. Dallin/K. Woodward/I. Masterson)
"The Runner" (Buzz Junkies 12" Mix) (G. Moroder/S. Ferguson)
CD Single
"Love Don't Live Here" (Radio Mix) (S. Dallin/K. Woodward/I. Masterson)
"Every Shade Of Blue 2010" (S. Dallin/G. Miller/S. Torch/K. Woodward/P. Barry)
Download
iTunes Exclusive Remix Bundle
"Love Don't Live Here" (Radio Mix) (S. Dallin/K. Woodward/I. Masterson)
"Love Don't Live Here" (Ian Masterson's Extended Mix) (S. Dallin/K. Woodward/I. Masterson)
Remixed by Ian Masterson
"The Runner" (Buzz Junkies 7" Mix) (G. Moroder/S. Ferguson)
"The Runner" (Buzz Junkies 12" Mix) (G. Moroder/S. Ferguson)
Remixed by Buzz Junkies

Charts

References

2010 singles
Bananarama songs
Songs written by Sara Dallin
Songs written by Keren Woodward
Songs written by Ian Masterson
Song recordings produced by Ian Masterson
Fascination Records singles
2008 songs